Palpada pusilla is a species of syrphid fly in the family Syrphidae.

References

Eristalinae
Articles created by Qbugbot
Insects described in 1842
Taxa named by Pierre-Justin-Marie Macquart
Hoverflies of North America
Diptera of South America